is a video game director best known as the series director of the Tales role-playing game series. He presently works for Namco Tales Studio where he is a minority shareholder.

References

External links

Year of birth missing (living people)
Living people
Japanese video game directors